Chromodomain-helicase-DNA-binding protein 3 is an enzyme that in humans is encoded by the CHD3 gene.

Function 

This gene encodes a member of the CHD family of proteins which are characterized by the presence of chromo (chromatin organization modifier) domains and SNF2-related helicase/ATPase domains. This protein is one of the components of a histone deacetylase complex referred to as the Mi-2/NuRD complex which participates in the remodeling of chromatin by deacetylating histones. Chromatin remodeling is essential for many processes including transcription. Autoantibodies against this protein are found in a subset of patients with dermatomyositis. Three alternatively spliced transcripts encoding different isoforms have been described.

Mutations in CHD3 cause a neurodevelopmental syndrome (Snijders Blok-Campeau syndrome) with macrocephaly and impaired speech and language.

Interactions 

CHD3 has been shown to interact with:
 HDAC1, 
 Histone deacetylase 2  and
 SERBP1.

References

External links

Further reading